The Cowlitz River is a river in the state of Washington in the United States, a tributary of the Columbia River. Its tributaries drain a large region including the slopes of Mount Rainier, Mount Adams, and Mount St. Helens.

The Cowlitz has a  drainage basin, located between the Cascade Range in eastern Lewis County, Washington and the cities of Kelso and Longview.

Major tributaries of the Cowlitz River include the Cispus River and the Toutle River, which was overtaken by volcanic mudflows (lahars) during the May 1980 eruption of Mount St. Helens.

When the smelt spawn in the Cowlitz River, the gulls go into a feeding frenzy that lasts for weeks. Kelso, Washington is known as the "Smelt Capital of the World".

Dams
The Cowlitz River has three major hydroelectric dams, with several small-scale hydropower and sediment retention structures within the Cowlitz Basin.

The Cowlitz Falls Project is a 70 megawatt hydroelectric dam built in the early 1990s and completed in 1994. The Cowlitz Falls Project produces on average 260 GWh annually for Lewis County PUD. Its reservoir, Lake Scanewa, is located at the confluence of the Cowlitz and Cispus Rivers downstream of Randle.

Mossyrock Dam began generating power for Tacoma City Light in 1968. It is the highest dam in the Pacific Northwest. The dam is named for the nearby city of Mossyrock, and the lake for the town of Riffe, which, along with Kosmos, was destroyed by the flooding of the Cowlitz River valley above the dam.

An  tunnel connects the reservoir to the powerhouse. The dam began producing electricity in 1963. Mayfield Lake offers many recreational opportunities: there are several county and state parks and the lake is below the Mossyrock Dam. The modulated inflow from the Mossyrock Dam allows Mayfield Lake to maintain a water level that rarely fluctuates more than a few feet. It is located several miles downstream of Mossyrock.

Packwood Lake was dammed in 1964 by the Washington Public Power Supply System (now called Energy Northwest). The dam holds back the lake (previously held back by an ancient landslide), redirecting streamflow to a 27 megawatt hydroelectric generator in the Cowlitz River valley floor 2,000 feet (600 m) below just outside the town of Packwood. When designing and building the dam, care was taken so as not to affect the abundant wildlife of the lake and surrounding area: the dam raised the water level by only a few feet.

A serious side effect of the Mount St. Helens 1980 eruption has been the downstream movement of enormous amounts of sediment through the North Fork Toutle River. After the eruption, river-borne sediment increased over five thousand-fold, making the Toutle River one of the most sediment-laden rivers in the world. The Toutle River Sediment Retention Structure was constructed to trap this sediment before it was carried farther downstream, where it could clog the river channel, exacerbate floods along the lower Toutle and Cowlitz Rivers, and fill the Columbia River shipping channel, which still requires periodic dredging. An overflow channel has been added to divert lahars around the dam.

Bridges

Numerous road and rail bridges span the Cowlitz.

Just upstream from its mouth at the Columbia river, a railroad bridge connecting the Port of Longview to the BNSF rail line crosses the Cowlitz, with a road bridge for SR 432 (Tennant Way) beside.

Further upstream are the Allen St. and Cowlitz Way bridges, connecting West Kelso with the rest of Kelso. Just north of Kelso, a railroad bridge provides crossing for the Columbia & Cowlitz Railroad.

Connecting SR 411 to Interstate-5 is the Lexington bridge, a two-lane bridge between the large unincorporated community of Lexington to Exit 42 on the east side of the bank.

At Castle Rock, the A St. bridge provides access from downtown to the school and residential areas across the river. A few miles north, after the Toutle River split, the BNSF line crosses the river.

Across the Lewis/Cowlitz County line, between the towns of Vader and Toledo, Washington, I-5 crosses the river. At Toledo, SR-505 crosses the river as well.

Where Highway 12 crosses Mayfield Lake, just west of Mossyrock, causeways were built out to the middle of the lake, where a short bridge section connects the two sides. A small bridge provides a crossing for SR 122 at the head of Mayfield Lake.

At the head of Riffe Lake, the 27 Road provides access to the forestland south of the Cowlitz from Morton and Glenoma to the north.

At Randle, SR 131 crosses the Cowlitz to provide access to the Cispus basin and the northern areas of the Mount St. Helens National Volcanic Monument.

Between Randle and Packwood, Highway 12 crosses the Cowlitz at the Cora bridge.

At Packwood, Skate Creek Road spans the river, providing access to the Gifford Pinchot National Forest and Tatoosh Wilderness, as well as connecting the downtown and residential areas of Packwood.

Upstream from Packwood, the Cowlitz splits into the Muddy and Clear Forks, with several Forest Service and Park Service roads crossing each.

Other river structures
When the Cowlitz Salmon Hatchery began operation in 1968, it was the largest of its kind in the world. Currently, it produces nearly 13 million fish each year. Adjacent is the barrier dam, which diverts spawning and upriver migrating fish to a separating station where fish are sorted by species. Some of the fish are used by the hatchery while others are transported upstream to continue migration.

The Bonneville Power Administration, in cooperation with the Lewis County PUD, state and federal agencies and Tacoma Power, constructed a downstream anadromous fish collection facility as part of the Cowlitz Falls Project. The fish facility, along with the Cowlitz River Salmon Hatchery's diversion dam below Mayfield Lake, has permitted the reintroduction of salmon and steelhead in the upper Cowlitz River basin for the first time since the construction of the Mossyrock and Mayfield dams in the 1960s.

Main tributaries
 Ohanapecosh River
 Lake Creek
 Johnson Creek
 Cispus River
 Tilton River
 Sulphur Creek
 Winston Creek
 Lacamas Creek
 Olequa Creek
 Toutle River
 Coweeman River

Recreation
The Cowliz River's two hatcheries provide an exceptional sportfishing opportunity for recreational anglers in Washington and Oregon.  The river consistently ranks as one of the states top ten steelhead and salmon producers.

See also
List of rivers of Washington
Tributaries of the Columbia River

References

External links

 USGS Cowlitz River Basin map
 Cowlitz Falls Project
 energy-northwest.com
 The Army Corps of Engineers' Mt. St. Helens Sediment Retention Structure

Rivers of Washington (state)
Tributaries of the Columbia River
Rivers of Cowlitz County, Washington
Rivers of Lewis County, Washington
Gifford Pinchot National Forest
Mount Rainier